Mylabris oleae is a species of beetle belonging to the Meloidae family.

Distribution
This species occurs in North Africa.

References
 Biolib
 Fauna Europaea

Meloidae
Beetles described in 1840
Beetles of North Africa